{{DISPLAYTITLE:C2H2O3}}
The molecular formula C2H2O3 (molar mass: 74.04 g/mol, exact mass: 74.0004 u) may refer to:

 Formic anhydride, or methanoic anhydride
 Glyoxylic acid, or oxoacetic acid